Rinch Mahalleh (also Romanized as Rīnch Maḩalleh) is a village in Khoshabar Rural District, in the Central District of Rezvanshahr County, Gilan Province, Iran. At the 2006 census, its population was 507, in 128 families.

References 

Populated places in Rezvanshahr County